This is a list of films produced in the Honduran film industry from 1962 to the present.

20th century

1960

1970

1980

1990

21st century

2000

2010

2020

See also 

 Cinema of Honduras
 Theater in Honduras
 Culture of Honduras
 Honduran literature
 Honduran folklore
 Theater in Honduras
 Education in Honduras

References

External links
 Honduran film at the Internet Movie Database

 
Lists of films by country of production